Canton High School is a public high school located in Canton, Illinois. The school serves about 700 students in grades 9 to 12 in the Canton Union School District.

The school's team name was once the Plowboys but was changed in 1932 to the Little Giants after a plow made by the International Harvester company in downtown Canton.

References

External links 
Canton High School website

Educational institutions established in 1860
Canton, Illinois
Public high schools in Illinois
Schools in Fulton County, Illinois
1860 establishments in Illinois